Saul Almeida (born June 4, 1992) is a Brazilian-American professional boxer and mixed martial artist. A professional mixed martial artist since 2008, Almeida has fought in Bellator, World Series of Fighting, Absolute Championship Berkut, and CES MMA.

Background
Almeida was born in Brazil where he lived until moving to Boston, Massachusetts at the age of eight. Almeida began training in karate and earned the rank of black belt, at the age of ten, Almeida began training in Brazilian jiu-jitsu. In high school, Almeida competed in wrestling and also trained in boxing.

Mixed martial arts career

Early career
Almeida made his professional debut in October 2008, defeating Iann de Oliveira via unanimous decision. He would then win his next 6 bouts, earning them mostly by decision before losing to Pete Jeffrey via guillotine choke submission at CES MMA: First Blood on September 17, 2010. Almeida then won his next two bouts, defeating Bobby Reardanz and Cody Stevens both by unanimous decision before making his Bellator debut.

Bellator MMA
Almeida made his Bellator debut on August 20, 2011 at Bellator 48. He faced Tateki Matsuda and won via unanimous decision.

Almeida next faced Matt Bessette at Bellator 63 on March 30, 2012. He lost the fight via unanimous decision.

Almeida was expected to face UFC veteran Kurt Pellegrino at Bellator 108 on November 15, 2013. However, Pellegrino pulled out of the fight due to injury. Almeida was removed from the card as a result.

Almeida instead fought outside of Bellator for his next three fights.

Almeida faced Goiti Yamauchi at Bellator 109 on November 22, 2013. He lost the fight via knockout in the first round.

Almeida faced Andrew Fisher in a Bellator season ten featherweight tournament alternate bout on February 28, 2014 at Bellator 110. He won the fight via unanimous decision.

Independent promotions
After leaving Bellator, with a 2-2 record in the organisation, Almeida has gone 3-0, with two finishes, on the local circuit.

World Series of Fighting
Almeida made his WSOF debut against Chris Foster on April 10, 2015 at WSOF 20. He won the fight via split decision.

Almeida returned to the promotion on October 17, 2015 at WSOF 24. He faced Alexandre de Almeida and lost the fight via submission in the first round. For his third fight, Almeida faced Bruce Boyington at WSOF 31 on June 17, 2016, and lost via split decision.

Professional boxing
Almeida made his professional boxing debut in 2012.

Mixed martial arts record

|-
| Loss
|align=center|19–9
|Adlan Bataev
|Decision (unanimous)
|ACB 84: Agujev vs. Burrell
|
|align=center|3
|align=center|5:00
|Bratislava, Slovakia
|
|-
| NC
|align=center|18–8 (1)
|Pedro Gonzalez
|Decision (Unanimous)
|CES MMA 45: Gooch vs. Coutinho
|
|align=center|5
|align=center|5:00
|Lincoln, Rhode Island, United States
|For CES MMA Interim Featherweight Championship; overturned after Gonzalez tested positive for a banned substance.
|-
| Win
|align=center|19–8
|Josh LaBerge
|Submission (rear-naked choke)
|CES MMA 42: Curtis vs. Santiago Jr.
|
|align=center|3
|align=center|4:50
|Lincoln, Rhode Island, United States
|Lightweight bout.
|-
| Loss
|align=center|18–8
|Manny Bermudez
|Decision (split)
|CES MMA 39: O'Neill vs. Santiago
|
|align=center|3
|align=center|5:00
|Plymouth, Massachusetts, United States
|
|-
| Loss
|align=center|18–7
|Bruce Boyington
|Decision (split)
|WSOF 31
|
|align=center|3
|align=center|5:00
|Mashantucket, Connecticut, United States
|Lightweight bout.
|-
| Loss
|align=center|18–6
|Alexandre de Almeida
|Submission (rear-naked choke)
|WSOF 24
|
|align=center|1
|align=center|1:23
|Mashantucket, Connecticut, United States
| 
|-
| Win
|align=center|18–5
| Chris Foster
|Decision (split)
|WSOF 20
|
|align=center|3 
|align=center|5:00
|Mashantucket, Connecticut, United States
|Returned to Featherweight.
|-
|Win
|align=center|17–5
|Franklin Isabel
|TKO (punches)
|Cage Fighting Xtreme 25
|
|align=center|1
|align=center|N/A
|Boston, Massachusetts, United States
|
|-
|Win
|align=center|16–5
|Andres Jeudi
|Decision (unanimous)
|CES MMA 24
|
|align=center|3
|align=center|5:00
|Lincoln, Rhode Island, United States
|
|-
|Win
|align=center|15–5
|Wayne Harnois
|Submission (rear-naked choke)
|Big Six Entertainment: The Carnage in Canton
|
|align=center|1
|align=center|4:14
|Canton, Massachusetts, United States
|
|-
|Win
|align=center|14–5
|Andrew Fisher
|Decision (unanimous)
|Bellator 110
|
|align=center|3
|align=center|5:00
|Uncasville, Connecticut, United States
|
|-
|Loss
|align=center|13–5
|Goiti Yamauchi
|KO (punches)
|Bellator 109
|
|align=center|1
|align=center|2:04
|Bethlehem, Pennsylvania, United States
|Catchweight (153 lbs) bout.
|-
|Win
|align=center|13–4
|Aguilano Brandao
|Submission (D'Arce choke)
|CZ 45: Ready to Rumble at The Rock
|
|align=center|2
|align=center|0:50
|Salem, New Hampshire, United States
|Catchweight (165 lbs) bout.
|-
|Loss
|align=center|12–4
|Rob Font
|Decision (unanimous)
|CES MMA: Undisputed 2
|
|align=center|3
|align=center|5:00
|Lincoln, Rhode Island, United States
|
|-
|Loss
|align=center|12–3
|Calvin Kattar
|Decision (unanimous)
|CES MMA: Real Pain
|
|align=center|3
|align=center|5:00
|Providence, Rhode Island, United States
|
|-
|Loss
|align=center|12–2
|Matt Bessette
|Decision (unanimous)
|Bellator 63
|
|align=center|3
|align=center|5:00
|Uncasville, Connecticut, United States
|
|-
|Win
|align=center|12–1
|Jeff Anderson
|Decision (unanimous)
|CES MMA: Extreme Measures
|
|align=center|3
|align=center|5:00
|Lincoln, Rhode Island, United States
|
|-
|Win
|align=center|11–1
|Kevin Roddy
|Decision (split)
|CES MMA: Undisputed
|
|align=center|3
|align=center|5:00
|Lincoln, Rhode Island, United States
|Catchweight (150 lbs) bout.
|-
|Win
|align=center|10–1
|Tateki Matsuda
|Decision (unanimous)
|Bellator 48
|
|align=center|3
|align=center|5:00
|Uncasville, Connecticut, United States
|
|-
|Win
|align=center|9–1
|Cody Stevens
|Decision (unanimous)
|CES MMA: Nowhere to Run
|
|align=center|3
|align=center|5:00
|Lincoln, Rhode Island, United States
|Catchweight (157 lbs) bout.
|-
|Win
|align=center|8–1
|Bobby Reardanz
|Decision (unanimous)
|CES MMA: Rhode Rage
|
|align=center|3
|align=center|5:00
|Lincoln, Rhode Island, United States
|
|-
|Loss
|align=center|7–1
|Pete Jeffrey
|Technical Submission (guillotine choke)
|CES MMA: First Blood
|
|align=center|3
|align=center|0:26
|Lincoln, Rhode Island, United States
|
|-
|Win
|align=center|7–0
|Chris Grandmaison
|Decision (unanimous)
|Xtreme Championship Fight League 1
|
|align=center|5
|align=center|5:00
|Marlborough, Massachusetts, United States
|
|-
|Win
|align=center|6–0
|Joe Manzello
|Decision (split)
|CFX: Wartown Beatdown 4
|
|align=center|3
|align=center|5:00
|Worcester, Massachusetts, United States
|Won vacant NECF Featherweight Championship.
|-
|Win
|align=center|5–0
|Kevin Corrigan
|Decision (unanimous)
|World Championship Fighting 8
|
|align=center|2
|align=center|5:00
|Wilmington, Massachusetts, United States
|
|-
|Win
|align=center|4–0
|Dan O'Keefe
|Submission (Peruvian necktie)
|World Championship Fighting 7
|
|align=center|1
|align=center|1:16
|Wilmington, Massachusetts, United States
|
|-
|Win
|align=center|3–0
|Jacob Irons
|Submission (forearm choke)
|ICE Fighter: Hostile Takeover
|
|align=center|1
|align=center|1:43
|Worcester, Massachusetts, United States
|
|-
|Win
|align=center|2–0
|Steve Butler
|Decision (unanimous)
|STG: Defiance
|
|align=center|3
|align=center|5:00
|Revere, Massachusetts, United States
|
|-
|Win
|align=center|1–0
|Iann de Oliveira
|Decision (unanimous)
|WFL 22: Back With A Vengeance
|
|align=center|3
|align=center|5:00
|Revere, Massachusetts, United States
|

References

Living people
1989 births
American male mixed martial artists
Brazilian male mixed martial artists
Lightweight mixed martial artists
Featherweight mixed martial artists
Mixed martial artists utilizing boxing
Mixed martial artists utilizing wrestling
Mixed martial artists utilizing karate
Mixed martial artists utilizing Brazilian jiu-jitsu
American male karateka
Brazilian male karateka
American male boxers
Brazilian male boxers
American male sport wrestlers
Brazilian male sport wrestlers
American practitioners of Brazilian jiu-jitsu
Brazilian practitioners of Brazilian jiu-jitsu
Brazilian emigrants to the United States